There are at least 28 named lakes and reservoirs in Sheridan County, Montana.

Lakes
 Brightsmen Lake, el. 
 Brush Lake, el. 
 Capeneys Lake, el. 
 Clear Lake, el. 
 Comers Lake, el. 
 Dominek Lake, el. 
 Flat Lake, el. 
 Gaulke Lake, el. 
 Goose Lake, el. 
 Horseshoe Lake, el. 
 Johnson Lake, el. 
 Katy Lake, el. 
 Larson Slough, el. 
 Lochin Slough, el. 
 Lone Tree Lake, el. 
 Long Lake, el. 
 Mallard Pond, el. 
 Mattson Slough, el. 
 North Lake, el. 
 Park Lake, el. 
 Salt Lake, el. 
 Syme Slough, el. 
 Tadpole Lake, el. 
 Widgeon Slough, el.

Reservoirs
 Boxelder Lake, el. 
 Homestead Lake, el. 
 Homestead Lake, el. 
 Medicine Lake, el.

See also
 List of lakes in Montana

Notes

Bodies of water of Sheridan County, Montana
Sheridan